RZ Pyxidis is eclipsing binary system in the constellation Pyxis, made up of two young stars less than 200,000 years old. Both are hot blue-white stars of spectral type B7V and are around 2.5 times the size of the Sun. One is around five times as luminous as the sun and the other around four times as luminous. The system is classified as a Beta Lyrae variable, he apparent magnitude ranging from 8.83 to 9.72 over 0.66 days.

References

Pyxis (constellation)
Beta Lyrae variables
B-type main-sequence stars
Durchmusterung objects
075920
043541
Pyxidis, RZ